Paolo Silvestri (born 23 January 1967) is an Italian freestyle skier. He competed in the men's moguls event at the 1992 Winter Olympics.

References

External links
 

1967 births
Living people
Italian male freestyle skiers
Olympic freestyle skiers of Italy
Freestyle skiers at the 1992 Winter Olympics
Sportspeople from the Province of Sondrio
20th-century Italian people